Through the Years may refer to:

Music
Through the Years, a 1932 Broadway musical with music by Vincent Youmans, or its title song

Albums
Through the Years (Artillery album), 2007
Through the Years (Cilla Black album) or the title song, 1993
Through the Years (Jethro Tull album), 1998
Through the Years / A Traves de los Años, by Selena, 2007
Through the Years: The Best of the Fray, 2016
Through the Years: A Retrospective, by Kenny Rogers, 1999
Thru the Years, by John Mayall, 1971

Songs
"Through the Years" (Kenny Rogers song), 1981
"Through the Years", by Gary Glitter, 1992
"Through the Years", by Invincible Overlord, 2005
"Through the Years", by Kylie Minogue from Impossible Princess, 1997

See also